Kusugal  is a village in the southern state of Karnataka, India. It is located in the Hubballi taluka of Dharwad district of Karnataka state.

Demographics
As of the 2011 Census of India there were 2,004 households in Kusugal and a total population of 9,825 consisting of 4,970 males and 4,855 females. There were 1,284 children ages 0-6.

A majority of the population is Hindu, with the next largest group being Muslim, along with a few Jain families.

Schools
 Noorandappa Chennappa Muttagi Kannad Gandu Makkal Shale
 Government High School
 Hennumakkal Shale
 Urdu School

See also
 Dharwad
 Districts of Karnataka

References

External links
 http://Dharwad.nic.in/

Villages in Dharwad district